Karingannoor  is a small township  of  Velinalloor village in the Kottarakara Taluk, Kollam District of Kerala, India.  It is surrounded by several small places:  Adayara, Puthuserry, Atoorkonam, Thannimoodu, Alumoodu, Mottarkunnu, Puthanvila, 504, Mulakuvila,  Perupuram and Ezhamkutty.

Public Facilities
The main centers of public activity in Karingannoor lower and upper primary schools, Velinalloor BSNL office, a post office Pin 691516,  Indian Overseas Bank Kringannoor 2466432, The Velinalloor Service Co-operative Bank LTD NO.2873, Velinalloor Agriculture Office, five temples, and a social service club centralizing in Karingannoor.

Local temples
Velinalloor Sriramaswamy temple
Puthussery Ayyappa temple
Sree Bhuvaneswari Devi Temple
Kuzhithrachalil Sree murugan temple
Mangad Ilanjikkal Temple
kovilkunnu SREE SUBRAMANYA SWAMI TEMPLE

References

External links
 kuzhithrachalil.org

Villages in Kollam district